Han is used as a name in many cultures. The Western usage of the name is as a variant of Hans.

 Han (Chinese surname) (韓/韩/Hán), also romanized Hon
 Han (Korean surname) (韓/한)
 Han (given name), a Dutch given name

Notable people with Han in their name include:
 Han Bennink, Dutch jazz musician
 Han Dongfang, Chinese human rights activist
 Han Fei, Chinese philosopher who developed the Chinese philosophy of Legalism
 Han Fu, several people
 Han Gan, Chinese painter of the Tang dynasty
 Han Go-eun, South Korean actress
 Han Hao, Chinese military officer of the Eastern Han dynasty
 Han Hoogerbrugge, Dutch digital artist
 Han Hye-jin (actress), South Korean actress
 Han Hye-jin (model), South Korean model
 Han Hye-ri, South Korean singer
 Han Hyo-joo, South Korean actress
 Han Ji-min, South Korean actress
 Han Kulker, Dutch middle distance runner
 Han Kuo-Huang, Chinese-born American ethnomusicologist
 Han Mahmud, Kurdish lord
 Han Polman, Dutch politician
 Han Shaogong, Chinese writer
 Han Sui, Chinese warlord of the Eastern Han dynasty
 Han Suk-kyu, South Korean actor
 Han Sun-hwa, South Korean singer and actress, former member of girl group Secret
 Han Terra, South Korean polymath
 Han Tuozhou, Chinese statesman of the Southern Song dynasty
 Han Woerdman, Dutch physicist
 Han Xianchu, general of the Chinese Communist armed forces
 Han Xiangzi, one of the Eight Immortals
 Han Xiaopeng, Chinese freestyle skier and Olympic gold medalist
 King Xin of Han, a vassal ruler under Emperor Gaozu of Han
 Han Xin, Chinese general
 Han Xinyun, Chinese tennis player
 Han Xuan, Chinese commander, administrator of the Eastern Han dynasty
 Han Yong-un, Korean Buddhist reformer and poet
 Han Yu, Chinese writer and poet
 Han Zhangluan, Chinese official of the Northern Qi dynasty
 Han Zheng, Chinese politician, former mayor of Shanghai
 Hon Sui Sen, Singaporean politician
 Jeen Han and Sunny Han, of the Han twins murder conspiracy
 Jefferson Han, American research scientist
 Jiawei Han, Chinese-American computer scientist
 Keiko Han, Japanese voice actress
 Lu Han, Chinese singer
 Mei Han, Chinese musician
 Raymond Han (born 1931), American/Hawaiian painter
 Thein Han, Burmese basketball player
 Tian Han, Chinese playwright, best known for writing the lyrics of the "March of the Volunteers"
 Yuny Han, South Korean actress

Fictional characters 
 Han Solo, in the Star Wars universe
 Han Pritcher, in the Foundation universe by Isaac Asimov
 Han Fastolfe, in the Elijah Baley Robots series by Isaac Asimov
 Han Lue, from The Fast and the Furious series
 Han Tzu ("Hot Soup"), a member of Ender's jeesh in the Ender's Game series by Orson Scott Card
 Han Qing-jao, a major character in the novel Xenocide of the Ender's Game series by Orson Scott Card
 Han Fu (fictional), in the 14th-century novel Romance of the Three Kingdoms by Luo Guanzhong
 Han Tao, in Water Margin
 Han Shan-tung, a Chinese triad mountain master from the Power of Five series by Anthony Horowitz
 Han Daewi, in the webtoon The God of High School

See also 
 Han (disambiguation)
 Zhang Han (disambiguation)

Surnames